The Triratna Buddhist Community (formerly the Friends of the Western Buddhist Order (FWBO)) is an international fellowship of Buddhists and others who aspire to its path of mindfulness. It was founded by Sangharakshita (born Dennis Philip Edward Lingwood) in the UK in 1967, and describes itself as "an international network dedicated to communicating Buddhist truths in ways appropriate to the modern world". In keeping with Buddhist traditions, it also pays attention to contemporary ideas, particularly drawn from Western philosophy, psychotherapy, and art.

Worldwide, more than 100 groups are affiliated with the community, including in North America, Australasia and Europe. In the UK, it is one of the largest Buddhist movements, with some 30 urban centres and retreat centres. The UK based international headquarters is at Adhisthana retreat centre in Coddington, Herefordshire. Its largest following, however, is in India, where it is known as Triratna Bauddha Mahāsaṅgha (TBM) (formerly the Trailokya Bauddha Mahasangha Sahayaka Gana (TBMSG)).

The community has been described as "perhaps the most successful attempt to create an ecumenical international Buddhist organization". It has also been criticised for lacking "spiritual lineage" and has faced allegations of sexual exploitation and abuse during the 1970s and 1980s.

Practices and activities
Meditation is the common thread through activities. Order members teach two practices: (a) "The mindfulness of breathing" (anapanasati), in which practitioners focus on the rise and fall of the breath; and (b) "The metta bhavana", which approximately translates from the original Pali as "the cultivation of lovingkindness". These practices are felt to be complementary in promoting equanimity and friendliness towards others. Some friends of the Order may have little, if any, other involvement in its activities; but friendship, Sangha, and community are encouraged at all levels as essential contexts for meditation.

The founder, Sangharakshita, taught a system of practice emphasising five types of meditation. The first two according to his system ('integration' and 'positive emotion'), can be correlated to the traditional category of "calming" "samatha" practices, and the last two (spiritual death and spiritual rebirth) can be correlated to "insight" or "vipassana" practices. For those not ordained into the Triratna Buddhist Order, the practices associated with the first two are emphasised, though the spirit of the last two is also taught. The five types of meditation correspond to five 'stages' of the spiritual life.

These five stages are:

 Integration. The main practice at this stage is the mindfulness of breathing, which is intended to have the effect of "integrating the psyche" – improving mindfulness and concentration, and reducing psychological conflict.
 Positive emotion. The second aspect of samatha is developing positivity – an other-regarding, life-affirming attitude. The Brahmavihara meditations, especially the 'metta bhavana' or cultivation of loving kindness meditations, are the key practices intended to foster the development of positive emotion.
 Spiritual death. The next stage is to develop insight into what is seen to be the emptiness of the self and reality. Meditations at this stage include considering the elements of which self and world are thought to be composed; contemplating impermanence (particularly of the body); contemplating suffering; and contemplating sunyata.
 Spiritual rebirth. Triratna teaches that, with the development of insight and the death of the limited ego-self, a person is spiritually reborn. Practices which involve the visualization of Buddhas and Bodhisattvas are among the main practices in this phase. At ordination, each dharmachari(ni) is given an advanced visualisation meditation on a particular figure.
 Receptivity  and spontaneous compassionate activity. The practice associated with this phase is known as 'Just sitting' or 'formless' meditation. Outside of meditation, this is the phase of 'Dharmic responsiveness' - doing whatever needs to be done in any situation.

Centres also teach scripture, yoga and other methods of self-improvement, some of which are felt by some commentators to come from outside the Buddhist tradition. Recently, community activities have begun to include outdoor festivals, online meditation courses, arts festivals, poetry and writing workshops, tai chi, karate, and pilgrimages to Buddhist holy sites in India. For many years, the community charity Karuna Trust (UK) has raised money for aid projects in India.

As among Buddhists generally, Puja is a ritual practice at some events, intended to awaken the desire to liberate all beings from suffering. The most common ritual consists of a puja, derived and adapted from the Bodhicaryavatara of Shantideva.

Retreats provide a chance to focus on meditational practice more intensely, in a residential context outside of a retreatant's everyday life. Community retreats can be broadly categorised into meditation retreats, study retreats, and solitary retreats. Retreat lengths vary from short weekends to one or two weeks.

Businesses, said to operate on the principle of "right livelihood", generate funds for the movement, as well seeking to provide environments for spiritual growth through employment. Emphasis is placed on teamwork, and on contributing to the welfare of others: for example by funding social projects and by considering ethical matters such as fair trade. The largest community business was Windhorse:Evolution, a gift wholesaling business and a chain of gift shops. Windhorse:Evolution closed down in 2015.

Many cities with a Triratna centre also have a residential community. The first of these was formed after a retreat where some participants wanted to continue retreat-style living. Since it was felt that the most stable communities tended to be single sex, this has become the paradigm for communities. Support from fellow practitioners in a community is seen to be effective in helping members make spiritual progress.

The largest Triratna centre in the UK is the London Buddhist Centre in Bethnal Green, East London, which offers drop-in lunchtime meditation sessions each weekday, open to beginners, as well as courses and classes through the week. The centre's courses for depression, based on the mindfulness-based cognitive behavioral therapy methodology of Jon Kabat-Zinn at the University of Massachusetts Amherst, featured in the Financial Times in 2008. This initiative is supported by the local authority, the London borough of Tower Hamlets. The Times has also reported on the centre's work with those affected by alcohol dependency

Defining the movement
According to the community, six characteristics define it:
 An ecumenical movement. It is not identified with any particular strand or school of Buddhism, but draws inspiration from many. It calls itself "ecumenical" rather than "eclectic" because it is founded on the premise that there is an underlying unity to all schools.
 "Going for refuge" is central. "Going for Refuge to the Three Jewels" – meaning the Buddha, the Dharma, and the Sangha – is considered to be what makes someone a Buddhist.
 A unified Order. Unlike some sangha, the community does not propagate a monastic lineage. Sangharakshita devised a non-monastic ordination system, whilst also allowing the undertaking of the "anagarika" precept which enjoins celibacy. Identical ordination is open to both sexes. While the movement regards single-sex activities as important to spiritual growth, men and women are recognised as being equally able to practice and develop spiritually.
 An emphasis on spiritual friendship. There is a strong emphasis on the sangha, and spiritual friendship based on shared values. The community teaches that spending time with friends who share ideals, and engaging in ritual practice with them, supports ethical living and the arising of the bodhicitta.
 Teamwork. Working together in teams, in the spirit of generosity and with a focus on ethics, is considered a transformative spiritual practice.
 Importance of art. Engagement in, and an appreciation of, the arts are considered to be a valuable aspect of spiritual practice. The community teaches that a refinement of one's artistic tastes can help refine emotional sensitivity and provide a channel for the expression of right living, and spiritual growth. More broadly, the movement seeks ways to re-express Buddhism by making connections with sympathetic elements in the surrounding culture, regarding the arts as such an aspect of western culture.

"The FWBO's attitude to spreading the Dharma is one of heartfelt urgency," wrote Stephen Batchelor, a prominent British Buddhist author, in a book published in 1994. "For the FWBO, Western Society as such needs to be subject to the unflinching scrutiny of Buddhist values."

The Triratna Buddhist Order
The Triratna Buddhist Order is the focal-point of the community, and is a network of friendships between individuals who have made personal commitments to the Buddha, the dharma and the sangha, in communion with others.
Members are known as dharmacharis (masculine) or dharmacharinis (feminine), and are ordained in accord with a ceremony formulated by the founder. At ordination they are given a religious name in Pali or Sanskrit. While there is an informal hierarchy within the order, there are no higher ordinations. A small number of members, however, take vows of celibacy and adopt a simpler lifestyle. Contrary to the traditional Buddhist structure of separating lay and monastic members, the order combines monastic and lay lifestyles under one ordination, a practice not dissimilar to that which evolved in some Japanese schools of Buddhism. When members are ordained, they are given a white kesa to signify their ordination; golden kesas may be taken later by those choosing to make a public commitment to greater simplicity of lifestyle, including celibacy.

As with followers of the Shingon school of Buddhism, order members observe ten precepts (ethical training rules). These precepts are different from monastic vows and do not appear in the Vinaya Pitaka, but were formulated on the basis of the so-called "dasa-kusala-dhammas" (ten wholesome actions). These are found in several places in the Pāli Canon, as well as in some Sanskrit sources. The karma sections of the fundamental meditation texts of all four schools of Tibetan Buddhism also list these acts as basic guidelines for lay or ordained practitioners intent on observing the law of cause and effect.

Beyond this, a commitment to personal dharma practice and to remain in communication with other members are the only expectations. Ordination confers no special status, nor any specific responsibilities, although many order members choose to take on responsibilities for such things as teaching meditation and dharma. In mid-2008, there were around 1,500 members of the order, in more than 20 countries.

The wider community
In the Triratna community, as in the Theravada, Mahayana and Vajrayana traditions, sangha is interpreted as the Buddhist community as a whole. Someone who regularly attends community activities is considered to be a "friend". Friends do not have to regard themselves as Buddhists, and can be of any faith, or none. Some choose, after some time, to participate in a formal ceremony of affiliation, and thus become a "mitra." "Mitra" is Sanskrit for "friend", which in this case denotes a person who considers themselves Buddhist, who makes an effort to live in accordance with the five ethical precepts, and who feels that this spiritual community is the appropriate one for them.

Those who wish to join the Order must request this in writing. It will then take several years to prepare for ordination. This is an informal process, the focus of which is to deepen one's commitment.

Some Friends, Mitras and Order members decide, at least for a while, to study teachings from outside the community, including non-Buddhist traditions such as Sufism.

History
As the Friends of the Western Buddhist Order, the community was founded in London in April 1967 by Sangharakshita. He had then recently returned to England after spending two decades as a Buddhist and monk in India, following demobilisation from the British army. He had been born in south London as Dennis Lingwood, in August 1925. He would lead the organisation until his formal retirement in 1995, and would continue to exert a decisive influence on its thinking and practices thereafter.

In the 1990s, the order grew in India, and, according to the Encyclopedia of Buddhism, Indian members now make up about half the movement's formal membership. In a book published in 2005, the FWBO's members and supporters were estimated to number 100,000, the majority of whom were in India.

In 1997, the responsibility for ordination and spiritual leadership passed to a "preceptor's college", based in Birmingham. In 2000, the first chair of a preceptor's council was chosen by Sangharakshita. In future, this position will be elected by the WBO to five-year terms.

In 2003, the public preceptors, responding to feedback, decided to move away from a formal relationship to the order and movement, and to concentrate on the ordination of new order members, teaching and dharma practice. At the same time, to increase flexibility, the number of preceptors was expanded.

Name change
In the spring of 2010, the Western Buddhist Order and Friends of the Western Buddhist Order changed their names to the Triratna Buddhist Order (which approximates in English to the name used in India - Triratna Bauddha Mahasangha) and the Triratna Buddhist Community. Since its western foundation the movement had spread to other parts of the world, including India where it was known by a different, non-western, name, and Indian members had long wished for one single worldwide name. An official history acknowledges this to have been controversial among some Order members. ("Triratna" is a Sanskrit term meaning Three Jewels)

Controversies and criticism

Spiritual lineage
Although Sangharakshita studied under, and in some cases received initiations from, eminent Buddhist teachers during his two decades in India, including Jagdish Kashyap, Dhardo Rinpoche, HH Dudjom Rinpoche, HH Dilgo Khyentse, and Jamyang Khyentse Rinpoche, author James William Coleman has noted that "he never worked closely enough with any teacher to be recognized as a dharma-heir".

Rather than leadership by a guru, the community instead operates through what has been called a "friendly hierarchy," which some critics have said can cause problems. In 1997, Stephen Batchelor, a prominent Buddhist commentator, was quoted as saying that the FWBO operated as "a self-enclosed system" and that their writings "have the predictability of those who believe they have all the answers".

In 1980 Sangharakshita wrote of his "conviction that the less the FWBO is involved with 'Buddhist groups' and with individuals affiliated to existing Buddhist traditions, the better." Currently, however, the community is a member of the European Buddhist Union and the Network of Buddhist Organisations, individual members of the order serve on the board of the International Network of Engaged Buddhists, and the FWBO's former magazine, Dharma Life, frequently carried articles by Buddhists from other organisations.

1997 Guardian report
In October 1997, a report by Madeleine Bunting, then the religious affairs correspondent of the British Guardian newspaper, made wide-ranging allegations of sexual misconduct, dogmatism and misogyny within the movement during the 1970s and 1980s.

The most detailed complaints reported were claims by Mark Dunlop, who had lived with the movement's founder for a number of years in the early 1970s, and left the order in 1985. The report described intimate details of what Dunlop characterised as their relationship, and claimed that Sangharakshita, who declined to comment, had told him “that to develop spiritually he had to get over his anti-homosexual conditioning.”

The report contained further allegations from an anonymous source, who said that he had been persuaded into a sexual relationship with the leader of FWBO's centre in Croydon, south of London. “The head of the community was a very powerful, intrusive personality and incredibly manipulative. He would intuitively become aware of people's vulnerabilities,” the source was reported to have said.

A third concern drew on complaints by the mother of a former FWBO member who had committed suicide in 1990, following a history of depression. A report by a clinical psychologist said, among other things: “He feels the community attempted to alienate him from his family and from women, and that direct attempts were made to encourage him to practise homosexuality. He stated that he did not indulge in homosexual practices, although attempts were made for him to do so both by using inducements and by using threats.”

Sexuality, women and the family
Following The Guardian report, a widespread debate ensued. Critics pointed to writings by Sangharakshita, and his senior advisor Dharmachari Subhuti, which placed such emphasis on single-sex activities, and what the Triratna Buddhist Community calls “spiritual friendship”, that the potential for misunderstandings or inappropriate behaviour appeared to some to be inevitable.

The FWBO had long been known for questioning assumptions about family life, and, according to the Encyclopedia of Buddhism:

"Among the unique characteristics of the FWBO has been the open acceptance of homosexuality among the members. Order members have concluded that precept rules against abusing sexuality do not relate to the formal structure of sexual relations so much as to the nature of the relationship itself."

In an official biography of Sangharakshita, published in 1994, and reissued in 2009, Subhuti says: “Sangharakshita believes that men must break down their fear of homosexuality by facing the fact that there may be some element of sexual attraction towards their friends.”

The Guardian report also raised controversy over statements by Sangharakshita which it interpreted as adverse to women and the family. Expressing views found in Buddhist texts from their earliest times, he has argued, for example, that, at least in the early stages of their spiritual careers, men are more apt to commit themselves to the spiritual life than women. In 1986, he wrote that the couple and nuclear family can be sources of neurosis.
"A couple consists, in fact, of two half-people, each of whom unconsciously invests part of his or her total being in the other: each is dependent on the other for the kind of psychological security that can be found, ultimately, only within oneself."(Sangharakshita, 1986, Alternative Traditions).

Although scriptures and historians recognize that the Buddha himself had concerns over such issues, particularly after the birth of his son Rahula, when he left home convinced that "family life was incompatible with the highest forms of spirituality", critics cite Sangharakshita's conservative views as evidence that misogynystic attitudes persisted in the FWBO during the 1980s.
Evidence that those ideas may have been more widely held is also found in the writings of Subhuti, who echoes the sutras when he says in his book, 'Women, men and angels,' that to be reborn as a woman is to be less spiritually able than to be reborn as a man.

As a movement, what was then the FWBO gave detailed responses and staunchly supported its founder, while in 2010 the renamed movement published an official history which acknowledged widespread concern among order members that, at least in the 1980s and before, the founder had misused his position as a Buddhist teacher to sexually exploit young men.

The controversies attracted little public interest, and between 2004 and 2008 both The Guardian, and its sister Sunday newspaper, The Observer, ran three supportive articles, recommending community activities.
A Guardian Web directory listed the FWBO website as "a good starting point for children."

In a 2009 interview with a member of the group, Sangharakshita replied to a question about sex between him and students: “Perhaps in a very few cases they were not as willing as I had supposed at the time – that is possible." In reply to a follow-up question, he said: "I did not regard myself as a teacher with a capital T.” He added: “I have had many, many human encounters, the great majority non-sexual, and most of those encounters, including the sexual ones, have been satisfactory for both parties. If there were any encounters that were not satisfactory for the other person, whether at the time or in retrospect, then that is a pity and I am truly sorry that that should be the case."

2016 abuse report
In September 2016, BBC News reported that former members of the Triratna movement claimed that they had been subject to sexual abuse by Sangharakshita at the group's retreat centre in Norfolk. Following discussion on social media, another former member claimed that he had been groomed for sex by another senior member of the order at the group's centre in Croydon in 1980s when he was 16 years old.

On 4 January 2017, following his treatment in hospital for pneumonia, Sangharakshita issued a statement expressing “deep regret for all the occasions on which I have hurt, harmed or upset fellow Buddhists, and ask for their forgiveness." On 19 January 2017, Triratna's leadership issued a statement in response to Sangharakshita’s apology: “Consideration of some aspects of Bhante [Sangharakshita]'s past has been difficult for some of us in the College, as it has been for many of our brothers and sisters in the Order and others associated with our community. Bhante is the founder of our Order and Movement, and we feel enormous appreciation and gratitude to him for his teachings and inspiration – and yet at the same time we must acknowledge the effects of some of his past actions."

2018 internal report
In October 2018, a group of members of the Triratna community released an internal report saying that more than one in 10 of them claim to have experienced or observed sexual misconduct while in the order, by Sangharakshita and other senior members. In July 2019, the group shared the report with The Observer newspaper.

References

Further reading
 Mellor P. ‘Protestant Buddhism? The Cultural Translation of Buddhism in England,’ Religion, 21(1): 73–93.
 Vajragupta, 'The Triratna Story; Behind the Scenes of a New Buddhist Movement' Windhorse Publications, 2010.

External links

Triratna Buddhist Community sites
 Triratna Buddhist Community Official Site
 Triratna Buddhist Community News News and information related to the Triratna Buddhist Community
 Triratna Buddhist Community People Triratna Buddhist Community People
 Sangharakshita.org Sangharakshita's home page
 Dharma Life website of Triratna Buddhist Community-produced magazine
 Buddhist free audio online online free Buddhist audio talks and discussions
 Karuna Trust Buddhist Trust working against poverty and discrimination in South Asia
 Windhorse Publications Publication and distribution of Buddhist literature
 TBMSG renamed Triratna Baudha Mahasangha (TBM)

Outside views
 ex-FWBO a site which provides information about some of the perceived harmful aspects of the UK FWBO.
 FWBO Academic Bibliography lists books and academic articles by non-FWBO writers that discuss the FWBO
 Many Bodies, One Mind: Movements in British Buddhism by Ken Jones in Buddhist Peace Fellowship (Page Not Found)
 Journal of Global Buddhism Research summary by Sally A. McAra, (2000). Investigates Order members' narratives about their transformative relationship with the land, focusing on the retreat center Sudarshanaloka in New Zealand.
 Land of Beautiful Vision: Making a Buddhist Sacred Place in New Zealand by Sally McAra (2007). This is an in-depth study of Sudarshanaloka, developed from McAra's MA Thesis. Through anthropological research methods, McAra explores beyond the level of public discourse on Buddhism to investigate group members' narratives about a stupa that they completed in 1997, and their changing sense of relationship with the land.
 A Review of Extending the Hand of Fellowship by Sandra Bell, University of Durham. Journal of Buddhist Ethics (page not found)
 Working in the Right Spirit by Martin Baumann, University of Hannover. Journal of Buddhist Ethics. The application of Buddhist Right Livelihood in the FWBO. (page not found)
 Dangers in Devotion: Buddhist Cults and the Tasks of a Guru by John Crook, Western Chan Fellowship

Buddhist organisations based in the United Kingdom
Buddhist new religious movements
Religious organizations established in 1967
1967 establishments in the United Kingdom